The 2006 Saint Francis Cougars football team represented the University of Saint Francis, located in Fort Wayne, Indiana, in the 2006 NAIA football season. They were led by head coach Kevin Donley, who served his 9th year as the first and only head coach in the history of Saint Francis football.  The Cougars played their home games at Bishop John M. D'Arcy Stadium and were members of the Mid-States Football Association (MSFA) Mideast League (MEL). The Cougars finished in 1st place in the MSFA MEL division, and they received an automatic bid to the 2006 postseason NAIA playoffs.

The 2006 Cougars finished the regular season undefeated.  In the postseason playoffs, the Cougars advanced to the national championship game where they lost to the Cougars of Sioux Falls, 23-19.

Schedule 
On September 23, 2006, Saint Francis named its football field after Coach Donley in pregame ceremonies.  A third consecutive return to the NAIA championship game saw the third consecutive runner-up finish for the Cougars, this time to Sioux Falls (SD).

National awards and honors
   Senior linebacker Brian Kurtz was named as the 2006 NAIA Football Player of the Year.  This was the second time in Cougar football history that one of their players received the award.

Ranking movements

References

Saint Francis
Saint Francis Cougars football seasons
Saint Francis Cougars football